, known as Goemon and Mystical Ninja internationally, is a video game series created and produced by Konami. Etsunobu Ebisu is the joint producer of the franchise.

These games revolve around the main character, Goemon and his exploits. His character is loosely based on Ishikawa Goemon, the noble thief of Japanese folklore. While the early games emphasized Goemon as a noble thief, he eventually becomes more of a standard video game hero character. His trademarks are his blue bushy hair and weapon of choice, the kiseru. The games are set in a cartoonlike, mystical Feudal Japan, with many references to Japanese folklore. Although the series has its roots in action-adventure, the Ganbare Goemon series has features from genres including role-playing, puzzle video games and board games. Ganbare Goemon is popular in Japan. The series consists of video games, with its success spawning a wide series of merchandise and an anime and manga series.

Konami has generally regarded the Goemon games as too specific to the Japanese market to be released worldwide. However, five of them have been released overseas: The Legend of the Mystical Ninja for the Super NES, Mystical Ninja Starring Goemon and Goemon's Great Adventure for the Nintendo 64 and two titles for the Game Boy.

In 2002–2003, a mobile phone was released for the titled Ganbare Goemon: Tsūkai Game Apli series.

The latest original game of the series was Ganbare Goemon: Tōkai Dōchū Ōedo Tengu ri Kaeshi no Maki, released in Japan for the Nintendo DS in 2005. Since then, the series has been used primarily as themes for Konami's pachislot machines.

The series is represented in Super Smash Bros. Ultimate with a purchasable Goemon costume for Mii fighters, revealed during a Nintendo Direct in September 2019.

Related media

Anime

Original video animation
 A single-episode thirty-minute OVA was released in Japan in 1993 titled . The OVA starred the voice of Daiki Nakamura as Goemon and Hideyuki Umezu as Ebisumaru and featured segments parodying Gradius, Akumajō Dracula and TwinBee.
 A second-episode thirty-minute OVA was released in Japan in 1998 titled .

Television series

Manga
Goemon is the protagonist of many manga based on the video game series. There are several series, each one based on a different game. Most of the manga were illustrated by artist Hiroshi Obi and were published between 1991 and 1998 to accompany the release of each new game.

Obi died from a brain stem hemorrhage on August 3, 2014, at the age of 54.

List of games

Video games (main series)

Video games (spin-offs)

Other games

References

External links
 Official Konami of Japan Ganbare Goemon site
 

 
Konami franchises
Video game franchises
Video game franchises introduced in 1986
Video games about ninja
Video games developed in Japan
Video games adapted into television shows